This is a summary of 1983 in music in the United Kingdom, including the official charts from that year.

Events
8 January – The UK singles chart is tabulated from this week forward by The Gallup Organization. In 1984 electronic terminals will be used in selected stores to gather sales information, and the old "sales diary" method will be gradually phased out over the next few years.
30 May – Elton John releases his album Too Low for Zero, marking the beginning of his mid-1980s comeback after several albums disappointed in sales.
20 August – The Rolling Stones sign a new $28 million contract with CBS Records, the largest recording contract in history up to this time.
1 September – Joe Strummer and Paul Simonon of The Clash issue a press statement announcing that Mick Jones has been fired from the group.
20 September – The first ARMS Charity Concert is held at the Royal Albert Hall in London.
28 November – The first Now album is released.

Charts

Number one singles

Number one albums

Year-end charts
Note: The year-end charts published in Music Week on 7 January 1984 only covered the period 4 January to 17 December 1983 – the BPI Year Book 1984 included the complete charts to the end of 1983.

Best-selling singles

Best-selling albums

Notes:

Classical music
Alun Hoddinott - Quodlibet on Welsh Nursery Tunes - arr. for brass quintet
William Mathias - Symphony No. 2, Op.90 (Summer Music)
John Pickard - Nocturne in Black and Gold

Opera
Oliver Knussen - Where the Wild Things Are

Musical films
Monty Python's The Meaning of Life
The Pirates of Penzance, starring Kevin Kline and Angela Lansbury

Births
18 January - Antony Brant, singer (V)
3 March - Katie White, singer (The Ting Tings)
8 May - Matt Willis, singer and musician (Busted)
16 May - Mince Fratelli, musician (The Fratellis)
23 May - Heidi Range, singer (Sugababes)
17 June - Lee Ryan, singer (Blue)
30 June
Cheryl Cole, singer
Patrick Wolf, singer/songwriter
7 July - Aaron Buckingham, singer (V)
22 July - Jodi Albert, singer (Girl Thing)
18 August - Mika, singer
25 August - James Righton, musician (The Klaxons)
11 September - Matthew Halsall, jazz trumpeter and promoter
13 September - James Bourne, singer and musician (Busted), (Son Of Dork)
14 September - Amy Winehouse, singer-songwriter
25 September - Hayden Powell, jazz trumpeter and composer
24 October - V V Brown, English singer, songwriter, model, and producer
26 October - Ant Scott-Lee, singer (3SL)
8 November - Mark Harle, singer (V)

Deaths
5 January - Amy Evans, operatic soprano (born 1884)
28 January - Billy Fury, singer-songwriter (born 1940; heart attack)
22 February - Sir Adrian Boult, conductor (born 1889)
8 March - William Walton, composer (born 1902)
14 April - Pete Farndon, the Pretenders (born 1952; drug overdose)
12 July - Chris Wood, founding member of Traffic (born 1944; pneumonia)
19 November - Tom Evans, bassist of the rock group Badfinger (born 1947; suicide)

Music awards

Brit Awards
The 1983 Brit Awards winners were:

Best British producer: Trevor Horn
Best classical recording: John Williams - "Portrait"
Best international artist: Kid Creole and the Coconuts
Best Live Act: U2
Best selling album: Barbra Streisand - Love Songs (also released as Memories in the U.S.)
British breakthrough act: Yazoo
British female solo artist: Kim Wilde
British group: Dire Straits
British male solo artist: Paul McCartney
British single: Dexys Midnight Runners - "Come On Eileen"
Life achievement award: Pete Townshend
Outstanding contribution: The Beatles
Special Award: Chris Wright
The Sony award for technical excellence: Paul McCartney

See also
 1983 in British radio
 1983 in British television
 1983 in the United Kingdom
 List of British films of 1983

References

External links
BBC Radio 1's Chart Show
The Official Charts Company

 
British music
British music by year